Artyom Sergeyevich Sobol (born 4 July 1996) is a Russian football player.

Club career
He made his debut in the Russian Professional Football League for FC SKA Rostov-on-Don on 19 July 2015 in a game against FC Astrakhan.

He made his Russian Football National League debut for FC Armavir on 22 July 2018 in a game against FC Mordovia Saransk.

References

External links
 

1996 births
People from Kagalnitsky District
Sportspeople from Rostov Oblast
Living people
Russian footballers
Association football defenders
Association football midfielders
FC SKA Rostov-on-Don players
FC Rostov players
FC Armavir players
Russian First League players
Russian Second League players
FC Chayka Peschanokopskoye players